Judy Hensler is a fictional character in the American television sitcom Leave It to Beaver. The show aired from October 4, 1957 to June 20, 1963. Judy is a recurring character portrayed by Jeri Weil. She appeared in 31 of the show's 234 episodes, between October 1957 and October 1960.

Profile 
Judy Hensler is a classmate of the series' hero, "Beaver" Cleaver. She makes her first appearance in the premiere episode, "Beaver Gets 'Spelled", as a student in Miss Canfield's second grade class. Judy is a goody-goody who snitches on her school fellows, especially Beaver. In one episode, she believes Beaver is Miss Canfield's pet and urges him to prove her wrong by putting a spring-action snake in the teacher's desk drawer. Beaver does and regrets it. In another episode, Beaver begs his parents to buy him a sweater in a shop window. They buy it and Beaver wears it to school, only to discover Judy has the same sweater. Believing he has bought a girl's sweater, Beaver stuffs the sweater behind a candy machine at the movie theater and then faces discipline at home. On the show, Judy is rarely seen outside the classroom. She tries to curry favor with her teachers, but they are aware of her deviousness and keep her in check. Judy's parents are seen briefly in an episode about Beaver's being chosen to perform in a school play as a canary. Her final appearance is in the episode, "Beaver Becomes a Hero" (October 1960). She was later dropped and replaced by Penny Woods, who becomes Beaver's new nemesis. However unlike Judy, Penny becomes his frenemy and constant love-hate-relationship love interest.

References
Applebaum, Irwyn. The World According to Beaver. TV Books, 1984, 1998..
Bank, Frank. Call Me Lumpy: my Leave It To Beaver days and other wild Hollywood life . Addax, 2002.,.
Colella, Jennifer. The Leave It to Beaver Guide to Life: wholesome wisdom from the Cleavers! Running Press, 2006.,.
Leave It to Beaver: the complete first season. Universal Studios, 2005.
Leave It to Beaver: the complete second season. Universal Studios, 2006.
Mathers, Jerry. ...And Jerry Mather as "The Beaver". Berkley Boulevard Books, 1998.

Television characters introduced in 1957
Leave It to Beaver characters
Female characters in television
Child characters in television